The Book of Durrow is an illuminated manuscript dated to c. 700 that consists of text from the four Gospels gospel books, written in an Irish adaption of Vulgate Latin, and illustrated in the Insular script style.

Its origin and dating has been subject to much debate. The book was created in or near Durrow, County Offaly, on a site founded by Colum Cille (or Columba) (c. 521-97), rather than the sometimes proposed origin of Northumbria, a region that had close political and artistic ties with Ireland, and like Scotland, also venerated Colum Cille.

Historical records indicate that the book was probably at Durrow Abbey by 916, making it one of the earliest extant Insular manuscripts. It is badly damaged, and has been repaired and rebound many times over the centuries. Today it is in the Library of Trinity College Dublin (TCD MS 57).

Description

It is the oldest extant complete illuminated Insular gospel book, for example predating the Book of Kells by over a century. The text includes the Gospels of Matthew, Mark, Luke and John, plus several pieces of prefatory matter and canon tables. Its pages measure 245 by 145 mm and there are 248 vellum folios.  It contains a large illumination programme including six extant carpet pages, a full page miniature of the four evangelists' symbols, four full page miniatures, each containing a single evangelist symbol, and six pages with significant decorated initials and text. It is written in majuscule insular script (in effect the block capitals of the day), with some lacunae.

The page size has been reduced by subsequent rebindings, and most leaves are now single when unbound, where many or most would originally have been in "bifolia" or folded pairs.  It is clear that some pages have been inserted in the wrong places. The main significance of this is that it is unclear if there was originally a seventh carpet page.  Now Matthew does not have one, but there is, most unusually, one as the last page in the book.  Perhaps there were only ever six: one at the start of the book with a cross, one opposite the next page with the four symbols (as now), and one opposite each individual symbol at the start of each gospel. Otherwise the original programme of illumination seems to be complete, which is rare in manuscripts of this age.

In the standard account of the development of the Insular gospel book, the Book of Durrow follows the fragmentary Northumbrian Gospel Book Fragment (Durham Cathedral Library, A. II. 10.) and precedes the Book of Lindisfarne, which was begun around 700.

Illumination

The illumination of the book shows especially well the varied origins of the Insular style, and has been a focus for the intense art-historical discussion of the issue.  One thing that is clear is that the artist was unused to representing the human figure; his main attempt, the Man symbol for Matthew, has been described as a "walking buckle".  Apart from Anglo-Saxon metalwork, and Coptic and Syriac manuscript illustrations, the figure has been compared to a bronze figure with a panel of geometric enamel on his trunk, from a bucket found in Norway.

The animal iconography derives from Germanic zoomorphic designs; the depictions of the Jesus and the Evangelists from Pictish stones. The geometric borders and the carpet pages cause more disagreement.  The interlace, like that of the Durham fragment, is mostly large compared to the Book of Lindisfarne, but the extreme level of detail found in later Insular books begins here in the Celtic spirals and other curvilinear decoration used in initials and in sections of carpet pages.  The page illustrated at left has animal interlace around the sides that is drawn from Germanic Migration Period Animal Style II, as found for example in the Anglo-Saxon jewellery at Sutton Hoo, and on the Benty Grange hanging bowl.  But the circular panel in the centre seems, although not as precisely as other parts of the book, to draw on Celtic sources, although the three white circles at the edge recall Germanic metalwork studs in enamel or other techniques.

The Book of Durrow is unusual in that it does not use the traditional scheme, usual since Saint Jerome, for assigning the symbols to the Evangelists. Each Gospel begins with an Evangelist's symbol – a man for Matthew, an eagle for Mark (not the lion traditionally used), a calf for Luke and a lion for John (not the eagle traditionally used). This is also known as the pre-Vulgate arrangement. Each evangelist symbol, except the Man of Matthew is followed by a carpet page, followed by the initial page. This missing carpet page is assumed to have existed. A first possibility is that it was lost, and a second that it is in fact folio 3, which features swirling abstract decoration.  Where the four symbols appear together on folio 2r they appear in the normal order if read clockwise, and in the pre-Vulgate order if read anti-clockwise, which may be deliberate.

The first letter of the text is enlarged and decorated, with the following letters surrounded by dots. Parallels with metalwork can be noted in the rectangular body of St Matthew, which looks like a millefiori decoration, and in details of the carpet pages.

There is a sense of space in the design of all the pages of the Book of Durrow. Open vellum balances intensely decorated areas. Animal interlace of very high quality appears on folio 192v. Other motifs include spirals, triskeles, ribbon plaits and circular knots in the carpet pages and borders around the Four Evangelists.

Evangelists' symbols

History

Origin

The book is named after a monastery in Durrow, County Offaly, founded by Colum Cille late in his life, while he was abbot of Iona. Although Colum Cille founded monasterys in Ireland, Scotland and the early medieval Anglo-Saxon kingdom Northumbria in today's Northern England, a consensus amongst scholars is that the book was produced at Durrow, c. 700.

The colophon of the book (f. 247r) contains an erased and overwritten note which, according to one interpretation, is by "Colum" who scribed the book, which he said he did in twelve days. This probably relates to the belief that Colum Cille (Saint Columba) had created the book, but its date and authenticity is unclear. Twelve days is a plausible time to scribe one gospel, but not four, still less with all the decoration. What is known for certain is that Flann Sinna (877-916), High King of Ireland, commissioned a silver plated cumdach, or metalwork reliquary for the book. The shrine is the earliest known cumdach, but is long since lost. It was once believed to contain a relic of Colum Cille.

Preservation
A blank page contains a note by the Durrow scribe Flannchad Ua hEolais, probably from around 1100, relating to a legal dispute.  The shrine was lost in the 17th century, but its appearance, including an inscription recording the king's patronage, is recorded in a note from 1677, now bound into the book as folio IIv, although other inscriptions are not transcribed. Once in the shrine it was probably rarely if ever removed for use as a book.

In the 16th century, when Durrow Abbey was dissolved, the book went into private ownership.  It was borrowed and studied by James Ussher, probably when he was Bishop of Meath from 1621 to 1623. It managed to survive during that period despite at least one section of it being immersed in water by a farmer to create holy water to cure his cows.  In the period 1661 to 1682 it was given to the library at Trinity College, together with the Book of Kells, by Henry Jones while he was Bishop of Meath. The shrine and cover was lost during the occupation by troops in 1689.

Carpet pages
The Book of Durrow contains six carpet pages.

Notes

References

 Calkins, Robert G. Illuminated Books of the Middle Ages. Ithaca, New York: Cornell University Press, 1983.
 De Paor, Liam. "The Christian Triumph: The Golden Age". In: Treasures of early Irish art, 1500 B.C. to 1500 A.D: From the collections of the National Museum of Ireland, Royal Irish Academy, Trinity College Dublin. NY: Metropolitan Museum of Art, 1977. 
 Meehan, Bernard. The Book of Durrow: A Medieval Masterpiece at Trinity College Dublin, 1996, Town House, Dublin, 
 Mitchell, Perette. "The Inscriptions on Pre-Norman Irish Reliquaries". Proceedings of the Royal Irish Academy: Archaeology, Culture, History, Literature, volume 96C, no. 1, 1996. 
 Moss, Rachel. Medieval c. 400—c. 1600: Art and Architecture of Ireland. London: Yale University Press, 2014. 
 Moss, Rachel. The Book of Durrow. Dublin: Trinity College Library; London: Thames and Hudson, 2018. 
 Nordenfalk, Carl. Celtic and Anglo-Saxon Painting: Book illumination in the British Isles 600-800. Chatto & Windus, London  (New York: George Braziller), 1977
 O'Neill, Timothy. The Irish Hand: Scribes and Their Manuscripts From the Earliest Times. Cork: Cork University Press, 2014. 
Wilson, David M.; Anglo-Saxon Art: From The Seventh Century To The Norman Conquest, Thames and Hudson (US edn. Overlook Press),  1984
 Soderberg, John. "A Lost Cultural Exchange: Reconsidering the Bologna Shrine's Origin and Use". Proceedings of the Harvard Celtic Colloquium, volume 13, 1993. 
 Walther, Ingo. Codices Illustres. Berlin: Taschen Verlag, 2014.

External links

The Library of Trinity College Online Exhibition on the Book of Durrow
The Library of Trinity College catalogue entry
The Library of Trinity College full digitised Book of Durrow
Book of Durrow catalogue entry at University of North Carolina 
High resolution images at Google Arts & Culture
Treasures of early Irish art, 1500 B.C. to 1500 A.D., an exhibition catalogue from The Metropolitan Museum of Art (fully available online as PDF), which contains material on the Book of Durrow (cat. no. 27)

7th-century biblical manuscripts
7th-century illuminated manuscripts
7th-century Latin books
7th-century Latin writers
Gospel Books
Hiberno-Saxon manuscripts
History of County Offaly
Irish manuscripts
Library of Trinity College Dublin
Religion in County Offaly
Vetus Latina New Testament manuscripts